Buddy Fields was an American Negro league pitcher in the 1910s and 1920s.

Fields made his Negro leagues debut in 1918 with the Chicago American Giants. He went on to play for the Cleveland Browns, Cleveland Elites, and Dayton Marcos.

References

External links
 and Baseball-Reference Black Baseball Stats and Seamheads

Year of birth missing
Year of death missing
Place of birth missing
Place of death missing
Chicago American Giants players
Cleveland Browns (baseball) players
Cleveland Elites players
Dayton Marcos players
Baseball pitchers